Crawford is a part of the city of Trichy in the state of Tamil Nadu in India. This area is adjoining Edamalaipatti Pudur and located on Madurai Road (NH45B) 2.5 km from Trichy Central Bus Stand & 2 km from Trichy Railway Station. Crawford is surrounded by Tamil Nadu Special Police Quarters to the north, Military Camp to the east and Railway Quarters to the west.

Demographics
Residents are usually bankers, business people, teachers and clerical workers. The locality has an equal combination of middle-class and upper-middle-class people.

History

In the early 1920s Thiru. T.S.Arokiyasamy Pillai arranged to buy acres of land from the Kirappatti village community and established a colony for Roman Catholics. He and his friends, all the pioneers down from clustered Trichy town chose this thorn infested barren vacant area for their future residences and christened this as "Crawford Colony" on 28.05.1927.  Early in those days this area was not developed. The pioneers formed a cooperative society under No:R 305 on 28.08.1927 naming it as 'Crawford Catholic Cooperative Building Society.'Very large plots of size 150 by 90 feet, with wide roads were formed.

Electricity was unknown then. Mr. T.S. Arokiasamy Pillai started a rice mill as suggested by the then electric supply company - S.M.E.S.Company and brought electricity to this area.  The pioneers built a Catholic church and named it St. Therasa's church. The church was completed and consecrated in 1934. To honor the initiative and contribution of Mr. T.S.Arokiasamy Pillai a stone inscription has been erected on the church front wall.  The pioneers felt the need for a school and apportioned a space for it and The Little Flower Elementary School came up there. It is managed by the sisters of St. Anne, Trichy. A machine shop cum fabrication industry was started on the west side of the colony across the Madurai road which provided employment for local people. The land to the south of Colony Main Road was farmland and the present-day TSA Nagar, Anbu Nagar, State Bank Officers' Colony, were the offshoots of the well laid out Crawford Colony and became part and parcel of it.

Neighbourhood

 Crawford colony
 Cauvery nagar
 Muslim street
 Railway  colony
 TSP camp
 T.S.A Nagar
 Convent Street
 Mission Kovil Street
 Pillaiyar Kovil Street
 Kaveri Nagar
 Gandhi Nagar
 Anbu Nagar
 Arunachalam Nagar
 Bharathi min Nagar
 Joseph Colony
 Pushpam Colony
 SBI Officers Colony
 Arockiya Nagar

References

External links

Neighbourhoods and suburbs of Tiruchirappalli